Edwin Volney "Ed" Chapman (November 28, 1905 – May 3, 2000) was an American Major League Baseball pitcher who played for the Washington Senators in .

External links

1905 births
2000 deaths
Major League Baseball pitchers
Mississippi State Bulldogs baseball players
Baseball players from Mississippi
Scottdale Scotties players